Panimudakku is a 1972 Indian Malayalam-language film, directed and produced by P. N. Menon. The film stars Madhu, Ammini, Maya and Mohan Sharma. The film had musical score by M. S. Baburaj.

Cast

Madhu
P. R. Varalakshmi
Mohan Sharma
Prema
Sankaradi
Nilambur Balan
Aravindakshan
Baby Yamuna
Bahadoor
Balan K. Nair
Cindrella
George Angamali
Girish Kumar
Gopalakrishnan
Kalamandalam Kshemavathi
Kaviyoor Sasi
Kottarakkara Sreedharan Nair
Kuthiravattam Pappu
Kuttyedathi Vilasini
M. R. Menon
Narayanankutty
P. O. Thomas
Pala Thankam
Paravoor Bharathan
R. K. Nair
Ramani
Sasikala
Shantha
Susheela
Thankam
Vanchiyoor Radha
Xavier
Narayanan Nair

Soundtrack
The music was composed by M. S. Baburaj with lyrics by Vayalar Ramavarma.

References

External links
 

1972 films
1970s Malayalam-language films
Films directed by P. N. Menon (director)